Danilovka is a village in Smidovichsky District of Jewish Autonomous Oblast, Russia. Population: .

Geography
Danilovka stands on the right bank of the Tunguska. The road to the village of Danilovka goes north from the Volochayevka-2 railway station, the distance is about 4 km. Near the village there is the Komsomolsk–Dezhnyovka railway line; there is a railway bridge across the Tunguska.

Infrastructure
The village has a post office, a kindergarten school, a feldsher-obstetric station, a library and a culture house. The main enterprise is the Danilovsky agricultural cooperative.

References

Rural localities in the Jewish Autonomous Oblast